The Đoài line (Hán tự: 支兌; chi can also be translated to as branch) was the eighth dynasty of Hùng kings of the Hồng Bàng period of Văn Lang (now Vietnam). Starting approximately 1431 B.C., the line refers to the rule of Thừa Vân Lang and his successors, when the seat of government was centered at Phú Thọ.

History
Thừa Vân Lang was born approximately 1466 B.C., and took the regnal name of Hùng Vỹ Vương upon becoming Hùng king. The series of all Hùng kings following Thừa Vân Lang took that same regnal name of Hùng Vỹ Vương to rule over Văn Lang until approximately 1332 B.C.

References

Bibliography
Nguyễn Khắc Thuần (2008). Thế thứ các triều vua Việt Nam. Giáo Dục Publisher.

Ancient peoples
Hồng Bàng dynasty
14th-century BC disestablishments
15th-century BC establishments in Vietnam
2nd-millennium BC disestablishments